Datuk Wan Hisham bin Wan Salleh was a member of Terengganu State Executive Council in Malaysia and holds the State Infrastructure Development, Public Service and Communication Committee portfolio. He is also the chairman of T-Best Events, a State Government owned company which organised Monsoon Cup in Duyong, Terengganu.
In Monsoon Cup, he has managed to bring big sponsors to Terengganu namely BMW, RICHARD MILLE, MasterCard, Air Asia, TM, ASTRO and ESPN in supporting the event putting Terengganu on international TV. He informally known as the right hand of the Terengganu Chief Minister, Dato Idris Jusoh as he famously referred him as 'The Man Who Makes Thing Happen' in developing the state after taking over from the previous governing party after the general election in 2004. Apart from the Monsoon Cup success, he also had improved the state transportation system bringing East Coast Expressway connecting Terengganu to the west coast of Peninsula Malaysia cutting the time needed from 9 hours to 3 hours drive from Kuala Terengganu to Kuala Lumpur, the capital of Malaysia. He has also upgraded the airport, providing education programme for the suburban and elderly people on Information Technology, building free houses for the under poverty and recently has brought Terry Thoren to the state to start Animation Development Programme which is expecting to provide 4000 work opportunities in the state every year in animation and 3D industry.

Politics 
Dato' Wan Hisham won the Ladang State Assembly Seat in General Election in 2004 defeating Dr. Sulaiman from the opposition party of PAS allowing Barisan Nasional win 28 out of 32 seats in Terengganu seeing the Barisan Nasional taking over the State Government from the previous ruling party, PAS. He was then appointed by the Chief Minister Dato Idris Jusoh to join the State Executive Council holding the State Infrastructure Development, Public Service and Communication Committee portfolio due to his academic qualification and his vast experience in construction business. He was also then elected as the UMNO Treasurer for the state. However, he lost his seat in the 12th Malaysian General Election with a majority of 31 votes.

Other contributions 

As part of his interest in Scuba diving and holding PADI Advanced Open Diver licence, Dato' Wan Hisham is the current Advisor of Malaysian Coral Preservation Society (CoRal Malaysia) and Sahabat Alam (SELAM) which are currently the leading societies in preserving corals and maritime lives in Malaysia. Under his wing, CoRal Malaysia held 3 Malaysian Book of Record for underwater achievement namely The First Underwater Gallery in Pulau Bidong, Terengganu, The Biggest Underwater Painting in Pulau Kapas, Terengganu and The Biggest Underwater Flag Hoisting in Pulau Perhentian, Terengganu.

Education 
 Sek. Ren. Sultan Sulaiman 1, Kuala Terengganu.
 Sek. Men. Dato' Abdul Razak, Seremban, N. Sembilan
 United World College of South East Asia, Singapore (1974–1976).
 Bachelor of Economics, University of East Anglia (1976–1979).

Awards 
For his contribution in developing Terengganu, Dato' Wan Hisham was knighted by Sultan Mizan Zainal Abidin with Darjah Dato' Paduka Mahkota Terengganu (DPMT) (Knight Commander of the Crown Terengganu ) entitling him as Dato' (as known as Sir in England) in 2006. He has also received Setia Mahkota Terengganu (SMT)(Companion of the Crown Terengganu) from his majesty previously in 1990's and Pingat Jaksa Kebaktian (PJK)(Meritorious Service Medal) from His Majesty's father Sultan Mahmud Al-Muktafi Billah Shah back in 1980's along with Darjah Johan Negara (DJN) (Companion of the Victorious Kingdom) by Yang Dipertua Negeri Pulau Pinang and Ahli Mangku Negara (AMN) (Member of the Illustrious Order of the Defender of the Realm) from the previous Yang DiPertuan Agong in 2001.

When he was in United World College of South East Asia, he was awarded the 1st Class Ambassador Award for his all round achievement during his study.

References

External links
 Terengganu official website
 Mo,sooncup.com
 Umno-terrenganu.net
 Worldmatchracingtour.com
 TheStar.com
 TheStar.com
 Bernama.com

1956 births
Living people
Malaysian people of Malay descent
Malaysian businesspeople
Alumni of the University of East Anglia
Malaysian Muslims
Members of the Order of the Defender of the Realm
People from Terengganu
Members of the Terengganu State Legislative Assembly
Terengganu state executive councillors
People educated at a United World College